This is a list of gothic metal bands. Gothic metal is a genre of heavy metal music. It is characterized as a combination of the dark atmosphere of gothic rock with the aggression of heavy metal music. The genre originated during the early 1990s in Europe as an outgrowth of death/doom, a fusion of death metal, doom metal, and gothic rock. The music of gothic metal is diverse with bands known to adopt the gothic approach to different styles of heavy metal music. Lyrics are generally melodramatic and dark with inspiration from gothic fiction as well as personal experiences.

Members of metal bands such as After Forever, HIM and Nightwish have downplayed or dismissed the gothic label from their music. The issue is obscured further by bands that have since moved away from gothic metal or even heavy metal music altogether, as is the case for Anathema and The Gathering.

List of bands

See also
Gothic metal
List of gothic rock bands
List of heavy metal bands

References

Notes

External links
List of gothic metal bands on About.com

 
Gothic metal